Jalan Tun Jugah is a major and important road in Kuching Division, State of Sarawak, East Malaysia. It connects Jalan Simpang Tiga (going towards Kuching City) and Jalan Tun Razak (going towards Pending) in the northeast to Jalan Lapangan Terbang (going towards Kuching International Airport) and Jalan Dato Bandar Mustapha (going towards Serian) in the southwest.

List of intersections

Roads in Sarawak